The Morses Creek, is a perennial stream of the North-East Murray catchment of the Murray-Darling basin, is located in the Alpine region of Victoria, Australia.

Location and features
The river flows generally north by northwest all of its course through the remote national park, joined by three minor tributaries, before reaching its confluence with the Ovens River at the town of Bright. The river descends  over its  course.

Bright was originally named Morse's Creek. The name was changed to Bright in 1861 after British statesman John Bright, who lived from 1811 to 1889.

See also

References

North-East catchment
Rivers of Hume (region)
Victorian Alps